S122 may refer to :
 HMS Audacious (S122), a 2012 proposed Astute-class nuclear Fleet submarine of the Royal Navy
 S Matrozos (S 122), a Type 214 submarine